In India, board examinations refer to the public examinations that are conducted at the end of the 10th grade education (SSC), and at the end of the 12th grade education (HSC). The scores achieved in these exams are considered very important for getting into universities, professional courses or training programmes and other occupations

State Board Examinations
State board examinations are variously referred to as Madhyamik, Secondary State Certificate and Higher Secondary Certificate examinations. They are conducted and managed by education boards of different states in the country. They do not take place simultaneously due to the differences between syllabi and the examination itself. The examinations  generally held in the months of February and March, and the results are out in April and May as of 2022 for 10th and 12th.

Students have to apply for the examinations in November stating their personal details, subjects, and current educational status. Admit cards for the prescribed examination hall are received at the notified cell or their respective schools about 20–25 days prior to the commencement of the exam.

Examinations are offered for various fields. Class 10th students give exam in five core subjects which are Information Technology, English, Hindi/other languages of India (regional), Mathematics, Science and Social Studies. There is an option of choosing a sixth subject of your choice like Computer Science, Information Technology, Music, Fine Arts, Physical Education, Foreign Languages etc. Class 12th students have to choose one out of the three streams offered in schools which are Science, Commerce, and Humanities.

Science stream focuses on natural sciences and mathematics. The main subjects of this stream are English, Physics and Chemistry while students have to choose either Biology or Mathematics or both. Schools offer vocational subjects such as Computer science, Information technology, artificial intelligence, food nutrition and dietetics, biotechnology, Economics, Geography, and Web Application.
  
In Commerce stream, students are prepared for business, management, administration, trade and banking. The main subjects of this stream are English, Accountancy, Economics and Business Studies. Vocational subjects like Marketing, Retail, Taxation, Banking, Entrepreneurship,   Mathematics etc are offers by schools.

In Humanities, students study social sciences and liberal arts. The main subjects of this stream are English, History, Geography, Political Science and Economics (any 2/3 or all the 5 subjects depending upon the school). Schools offer vocational subjects such as Mass Media, Fashion Studies, Legal Studies, Psychology, Tourism, Beauty and Wellness, Home Science, Food nutrition and dietetics, Fine Arts, Sociology, and Philosophy.

Schools also offer Hindi as a subject. Some have kept Hindi as a compulsory subject while some have kept it optional. Some schools do not offer it.

Subjects like Business Administration, Economics, Music, Fine Arts, Physical Education, National Cadets Corps, Geography, Computer Science, Information Technology, Artificial Intelligence, Foreign languages are offered in all three streams.

The exam is conducted only in pen and paper format.

Procedure (CBSE)

Each of the examinations takes place simultaneously across the country, to ensure that questions are not leaked in advance across time zones. Security is usually high for these board examinations. The question papers are distributed by the overseeing board of education, and their contents are guarded closely until the exam begins. The examinations may include multiple sets of question papers as well. The candidates are issued identification passes in advance, which are presented to the staff at the examination site. The site itself must not be the same school where a candidate is from; to ensure impartiality, the candidate must travel to a different school to take the examination. For the same reason, the candidate may not identify himself/herself on the answer sheet except with an identity-masking number. Use of calculation aids other than logarithm tables, which are provided by the examination centre, is prohibited. Delhi High Court has directed CBSE to follow moderation policy in May 2017 due to which the results were delayed. The results of 2019 for Class 10 was declared on May 6, 2019. The Central Board of Secondary Education (CBSE) has announced that the 2023 board exams will start from 15 February 2023

ICSE
The ICSE Council was established in 1958 by the University of Cambridge Local Examinations Syndicate to ensure that its examinations become adapted to the educational needs of the country and assign the ultimate control of the same on the council. The council was registered as a Society under the Societies Registration Act XXI of 1860 on 19 December 1967.
The object of the council is educational, and includes the promotion of science, literature, the fine arts and the diffusion of useful knowledge by conducting school examinations through the medium of English. The Council exists solely for educational purposes and not for purposes of profit. Most schools following the CISCE curriculum are in the southern part of the country, while most schools in the northern part of the country follow the CBSE curriculum.

Evaluation (CBSE)
The answer sheets are sent back to the board of education overseeing the certifications. The CBSE board has ten regional offices for different states where the correction would occur. All foreign papers are sent to the office of the NCT(National Capital Territory) of India which is in New Delhi. The papers are evaluated based on examples of ideal answers. A false roll no. is attached to the answer-sheet before evaluation. Once the answers have been evaluated, the identity numbers are matched to the actual roll no. (and identity) of the candidate. This is so that no bias takes place on part of the examiner regarding the background, name, appearance, religion or community of the candidate. The board then issues an official grade/score report for the exam to the candidate, as well as a certificate of completion in the case of the HSC exam. Students only see their final grades and do not receive their graded answer sheets. The students can however opt to receive their graded answer sheets only after paying a small sum. Additionally the student can also opt for re-evaluation after paying another amount. The results can be obtained in writing or online. The CBSE site often crashes on the day the results are released.

See also
 Junior Science Talent Search Examination

References

External links
CBSE - Examination
CBSE Academic Website

School examinations in India
Educational institutions in India with year of establishment missing